Farlowella reticulata is a species of armored catfish native to French Guiana, Guyana and Suriname.  This species grows to a length of  SL.

References 

 

reticulata
Fish described in 1971
Fish of French Guiana
Vertebrates of Guyana
Fish of Suriname